Christopher J. Brown (born July 3, 1974) is an American football coach and former player. He played for Pittsburg State University in Pittsburg, Kansas, from 1992 to 1995. He became the head coach at Fort Hays State in 2011.

Playing career
Brown is a 1996 graduate of Pittsburg State University in Pittsburg, Kansas.  As a player for the Gorillas, he recorded 470 tackles in 43 starts during his career at free safety. Brown is one of only three Gorillas to earn All-American honors three times.

As a player, Brown was a unanimous All-American First Team selection his senior year, was named the CNN NCAA Division II National Player of the Year in 1995, and was named to the NCAA Quarter Century Team for all players from 1975 to 1999 at free safety. Brown recorded a record 21 tackles in the NCAA Division II National Championship as a freshman against Jacksonville State and was inducted into the Pittsburg State Athletic Hall of Fame in 2006.

Coaching career

High school and college assistant coaching
After completion of his playing time at Pittsburg State, Brown returned to his hometown Liberal, Kansas to be an assistant coach at Liberal High School from 1999 until the end of the 2001 season. He then became an assistant coach at Washburn University in Topeka, Kansas under head coach Craig Schurig from 2002 until completion of the 2010 season.

Fort Hays State
Brown was named the head coach for the Fort Hays Tigers located in Hays, Kansas beginning with the 2011 season. His team went 4–7 in the first season. The first game of the season was a 27–17 victory over cross-state rival Emporia State. In 2017, Brown broke a school record by leading the team to an undefeated regular season, the first in 100 years.

Head coaching record

References

External links
 Fort Hays State profile

1974 births
Living people
American football safeties
Fort Hays State Tigers football coaches
Pittsburg State Gorillas football players
Washburn Ichabods football coaches
High school football coaches in Kansas
People from Liberal, Kansas
Coaches of American football from Kansas
Players of American football from Kansas